Travis is an unincorporated community in southeast Falls County, Texas, United States. It is named after Travis Fleming Jones, who surveyed the site for the San Antonio and Aransas Pass Railway in the 1880s. The population was up to 300 in the 1920s and 1930s, but has decreased to 60 by 1990 and has steadily remained at that figure since.

References

Unincorporated communities in Texas
Unincorporated communities in Falls County, Texas